In number theory, Li's criterion is a particular statement about the positivity of a certain sequence that is equivalent to the Riemann hypothesis.  The criterion is named after Xian-Jin Li, who presented it in 1997. In 1999, Enrico Bombieri and Jeffrey C. Lagarias provided a generalization, showing that Li's  positivity condition applies to any collection of points that lie on the Re(s) = 1/2 axis.

Definition
The Riemann  function is given by

where ζ is the Riemann zeta function.  Consider the sequence

Li's criterion is then the statement that

the Riemann hypothesis is equivalent to the statement that  for every positive integer .

The numbers  (sometimes defined with a slightly different normalization) are called Keiper-Li coefficients or Li coefficients. They may also be expressed in terms of the non-trivial zeros of the Riemann zeta function:

where the sum extends over ρ, the non-trivial zeros of the zeta function. This conditionally convergent sum should be understood in the sense that is usually used in number theory, namely, that

(Re(s) and Im(s) denote the real and imaginary parts of s, respectively.)

Proof

Note that .

Then, starting with an entire function , let .

 vanishes when . Hence,  is holomorphic on the unit disk  iff .

Write the Taylor series .  Since 
 
we have 

so that 
. 
Finally, if each zero  comes paired with its complex conjugate , then we may combine terms to get 

A generalization
Bombieri and Lagarias demonstrate that a similar criterion holds for any collection of complex numbers, and is thus not restricted to the Riemann hypothesis.  More precisely, let R = {ρ} be any collection of complex numbers ρ, not containing ρ = 1, which satisfies

Then one may make several equivalent statements about such a set. One such statement is the following:

One has  for every ρ if and only if

for all positive integers n.

One may make a more interesting statement, if the set R obeys a certain functional equation under the replacement s ↦ 1 − s.

One has Re(ρ) = 1/2 for every ρ if and only if

for all positive integers n.

Bombieri and Lagarias also show that Li's criterion follows from Weil's criterion for the Riemann hypothesis.

References

Zeta and L-functions